Jon or John Sheffield may refer to:

English peers and politicians
John Sheffield, 2nd Baron Sheffield (c. 1538–1568)
John Sheffield (MP) (died 1614), MP for Lincolnshire (UK Parliament constituency)#MPs 1290-1640, 1601–1614
John Sheffield, 1st Duke of Buckingham and Normanby (1648–1721), poet and politician

Sportspeople
John Sheffield (athlete) (1910–1987), British Olympic hurdler
Jon Sheffield (born 1959), English football goalkeeper

Others
Johnny Sheffield (1931–2010), American child actor